St George Soccer Stadium is a soccer stadium in Banksia, New South Wales, Australia.

History
The ground was opened in 1978 to be the home of St George-Budapest who played in local competition until playing in the national competition at the time, the National Soccer League. The ground occupies a part of Barton Park, next to Muddy Creek, a tributary of the Cooks River in Banksia. Over time the stadium has been used less and less, commensurate with its dilapidation. The stadium has never been renovated over its lifespan.

In 2005 the St George Saints were controversially axed from the new look New South Wales Premier League and took legal action against the decision along with the Bonnyrigg White Eagles, but were unsuccessful. They now play in the New South Wales Super League, which is one level below the state's highest, the NSW Premier League.

In 2006, the St George-Budapest club, now the St George Saints, played their last match at the stadium for several years, deeming it unsafe and unstable, with the grandstand on the verge of collapse. The St George Saints then played at various locations including the Belmore Sports Ground (an arena outside the St George district) and Kogarah Jubilee Oval.

Between 2007 and 2008 the ground was not fit to be used as a playing arena. It was widely vandalised with graffiti, with litter on the pitch and throughout the stand.  In the grandstand the floor and seating was pulled out. The stand had structural cracks running through the side of it, leaving the grandstand covered in security fences, due to fears of it being unstable. Once the home ground of a dominant NSL team, it appeared that the days of the 15,000 seat stadium were numbered.

There was ongoing discussion in the media that the St. George Illawarra Dragons and Sydney FC would play at a new stadium development at Barton Park, and for it to be transformed into Sydney's first football-only venue, but these talks had dissipated and the Dragons have since re-developed their traditional home at Kogarah Oval.

Uses of the Stadium
In March 2009, the St George Saints decided that they would use St George Stadium for its home games from the 2009 New South Wales Super League season onwards. They used this stadium between 2009-2013 with occasional higher-level games played at Jubilee Oval.

In 2014 the stadium was used for community level games (games conducted between St George clubs) only, with the St George Saints using Jubilee Oval.

With the demotion of St George Saints to NPL2, they have resumed using St George Stadium for its games in 2015.

Final day active football use of stadium to visit the iconic venue prior to its redevelopment as a Barton Park sporting precinct.

References

Sports venues in Sydney
Soccer venues in Sydney
Defunct soccer venues in Australia